Psyche is a semi-opera in five acts with music by Matthew Locke to a libretto by Thomas Shadwell with dances by Giovanni Battista Draghi. It was first performed at Dorset Garden Theatre, London on 27 February 1675 by the Duke's Company with choreography the French dancing-master Saint-André. Stage machinery was by Thomas Betterton and the scenery by Stephenson. The work is loosely based on Jean-Baptiste Lully's 1671 tragédie-ballet Psyché.

Composition, performance and publication
According to Peter Holman, Psyche was "the first semi-opera written from scratch." It has over a dozen musical episodes and requires a large orchestra. Holman believes Locke composed it in response to the visit to Britain of a French opera company under the direction of Robert Cambert, which performed the opera Ariane, ou le mariage de Bacchus at the Drury Lane Theatre in March, 1674. Locke had produced his first semi-opera, The Tempest, in the same year and was eager to follow up its success with Psyche. Despite the theatre charging treble the price for tickets and the lavish staging, it was not as great a financial triumph. As a contemporary, John Downes, wrote:The long expected Opera of Psyche came forth in all her Ornaments; new Scenes, new Machines, new Cloaths, new French Dances. This opera was also splendidly set out, especially in Scenes; the Charge of which amounted to some 800l. [i.e. £800]. It had a Continuance of Performance about 8 Days together, it prov'd very beneficial to the Company; yet the Tempest got them more Money.Nevertheless, Psyche helped establish the genre of semi-opera in England.

Locke published his music from both The Tempest and Psyche under the title The English Opera, omitting Draghi's dances. For his recording of the work, Philip Pickett orchestrated some of Draghi's harpsichord pieces to fill in these gaps.

Roles
Singing roles include: Venus, Proserpine, Pyracmon, River God, Apollo, Chief Priest, Praesul, Mars, Vulcan, Pan, Brontes, Pluto, Envy, Bacchus, Steropes, Nymphs.

Synopsis
The plot, which is extremely complicated, follows the Classical legend of Cupid and Psyche.

Cultural references to Psyche
Thomas Duffet parodied the work in his play Psyche Debauch'd, performed at Drury Lane in 1675. It is also mentioned in Dryden's satire on Shadwell, Mac Flecknoe.

Recordings
Psyche Catherine Bott, Christopher Robson, Paul Agnew, Michael George, New London Consort conducted by Philip Pickett (Decca L'Oiseau-Lyre, 1995)

References

Sources
 Shirley Strum Kenny (editor) The British Theatre and the Other Arts: 1660-1800 (Associated University Presses, 1984)
The Viking Opera Guide ed. Amanda Holden (1993)
Gramophone magazine: review of Pickett's recording by Jonathan Freeman-Attwood (February, 1996)

Semi-operas
Works by Thomas Shadwell
Cupid and Psyche
Works based on The Golden Ass